John Benjamin Grellinger (November 5, 1899 – April 13, 1984) served as a Roman Catholic auxiliary bishop of the Roman Catholic Diocese of Green Bay. He was also titular bishop of Syene.

Biography
Born in Milwaukee, Wisconsin, Grellinger entered Saint Francis Seminary in Milwaukee in 1922. He was ordained to the priesthood in Rome on July 14, 1929. On May 16, 1949, Pope Pius XII appointed Grellinger auxiliary bishop of the Green Bay Diocese and he was consecrated on July 14, 1949. Bishop Grellinger retired on September 21, 1974.

Notes

Religious leaders from Milwaukee
People from Green Bay, Wisconsin
Roman Catholic Diocese of Green Bay
20th-century Roman Catholic bishops in the United States
1899 births
1984 deaths
Catholics from Wisconsin